The Atlanta Hotel also known as Thompson's Hotel, was one of the original hotels in antebellum Atlanta, Georgia. It stood at the northwest side of State Square, pre-war Atlanta's central square, on the northwest side of Pryor Street between Decatur Street (then Marietta Street) and what is now Wall Street (which before the war was the railroad track).

The hotel was run by Dr. Joseph Thompson. The future vice-president of the Confederate States of America, Alexander H. Stephens, was stabbed in 1848 on the hotel's steps ("piazza") by Judge Francis H. Cone over a political argument.

The hotel was destroyed during General Sherman's burning of Atlanta.

See also 

 Hotels in Atlanta

References

 Robert Scott Davis, Civil War Atlanta, p.20
 M. Thomas Inge, High Times and Hard Times, p.86

Demolished hotels in Atlanta
Railway hotels in the United States
Burned hotels in the United States